Two Guns and a Badge is a 1954 American Western film directed by Lewis D. Collins and written by Daniel B. Ullman. The film stars Wayne Morris, Morris Ankrum, Beverly Garland, Roy Barcroft, William Edward Phipps and Damian O'Flynn. The film was released on September 12, 1954, by Allied Artists Pictures.

Plot

Roaming cowboy mistaken for a notorious killer is hired to bring law to the lawless town of Outpost. He is successful until the sheriff discovers he is not the killer and offers him a chance to leave.

Cast          
Wayne Morris as Deputy Jim Blake
Morris Ankrum as Sheriff Jackson
Beverly Garland as Gail Sterling
Roy Barcroft as Bill Sterling
William Edward Phipps as Dick Grant 
Damian O'Flynn as John Wilson 
I. Stanford Jolley as Sam Allen 
Robert J. Wilke as Moore 
Chuck Courtney as Val Moore 
John Pickard as Sharkey 
Henry Rowland as Rancher Jim Larkin
Gregg Barton as Outlaw

References

External links
 

1954 films
1950s English-language films
American Western (genre) films
1954 Western (genre) films
Allied Artists films
Films directed by Lewis D. Collins
Films scored by Raoul Kraushaar
American black-and-white films
1950s American films